Irene of Gold (German: Irene d'Or) is a 1923 German silent film directed by Karl Sander and Frederic Zelnik and starring Margarete Schlegel, Yelena Polevitskaya and Hans Albers.

Cast
Margarete Schlegel
Yelena Polevitskaya
Hans Albers
Rita Clermont
Olga Engl
Albert Patry
Frida Richard
Magnus Stifter
Leopold von Ledebur
Frederic Zelnik

References

External links

Films of the Weimar Republic
Films directed by Frederic Zelnik
German silent feature films
German black-and-white films